Hezbollah Organization was a militant organization in Iran with an aim to overthrow the Pahlavi dynasty and replace it with an Islamic government.

References

Islamist insurgent groups
Militant opposition to the Pahlavi dynasty
Political parties in Pahlavi Iran (1941–1979)
Shia Islamist groups